Alga (Alğa) is a rural locality (a village) and the administrative center of Alginsky Selsoviet, Davlekanovsky District, Bashkortostan, Russia. The population was 295 as of 2010.

References 

Rural localities in Davlekanovsky District